Raadi Airfield (Tartu Air Base)  is a former air base in Estonia located  northeast of Tartu. The land once belonged to Raadi Manor and is now designated as the new site of the Estonian National Museum.

History
In 1940  were requisitioned from the Raadi Manor estates to create a Russian airport. The airfield was fought over during the Second World War and the manor house was burnt during the Tartu Offensive.

The airport became a major Soviet bomber base for fifty years. The secrecy of the airfield meant that foreigners were not allowed to visit the city. Dozens of bombers were based here making it the largest Baltic airfield. The airfield is still seen as a reminder that Estonia was occupied by Soviet forces.

It was a fairly extensive base with 24 large revetments and over 30 small ones. This airfield was listed as No. 13 in USSR airfield priority, by the US in 1956. Meaning it was the only nuclear target in the Baltics at this time. It was a Soviet base, home to 132 TBAP (132nd Heavy Bomber Aviation Regiment) which flew Tupolev Tu-16 and Tupolev Tu-22M aircraft.  It was also a transport base with the 192 and/or 196 VTAP (Military Transport Aviation Regiment) flying Ilyushin Il-76M cargo aircraft until 1990. These aircraft were relocated to Tver.

On 15 January 1991, a Soviet Air Force Tupolev Tu-16K Badger crashed near Tartu Air Base, on landing when the undercarriage failed to extend. The pilot and co-pilot ejected, but the four crew members were killed.

Today
By 1993 it was listed as a designated emergency airfield on a Jeppesen chart for airline use although this is no longer possible as the runway has various used car lots preventing use by aircraft.  On 16 January 2006 the winning works of the international architecture competition held to design the new Estonian National Museum building were revealed. In 2016, the museum was opened.

In 2020, estimated 200,000 solar panels will be built on Raadi Airfield, making it the biggest solar farm in Estonia.

Gallery

References

Defunct airports in Estonia
Transport in Tartu
Tartu Parish
Soviet Air Force bases
Soviet Long Range Aviation
1910s establishments in Estonia
Buildings and structures in Tartu County
Buildings and structures in Tartu